William H. "Blackie" Pitt (March 18, 1925 – March 28, 1992) was a NASCAR Grand National Series racer born in the American town of Rocky Mount, North Carolina. He is best known as the 1954 NASCAR Rookie of the Year.

Career
Pitt raced from 1954 to 1958 and competed in 81 races in his four-year NASCAR career. One of his most memorable appearances in NASCAR was at the 1955 Southern 500; where he would race in a 1955 Ford Fairlane owned by his brother W.W. "Brownie" Pitt. This race would be captured on film and memorialized for future generations. His total career in NASCAR consisted of completing 9326 laps of professional American stock car racing. According to history, Pitt generally did better on short tracks than he did on road courses and intermediate tracks.

Pitt would end up contributing nineteen finishes in the top ten and accumulating  of stock car racing experience. His total career earnings is considered to be $5,619 ($ when adjusted for inflation). Pitt was the recipient of the 1954 NASCAR Rookie of the Year award although he never received an official trophy. Due to the sudden disqualification of Joe Weatherly and Jim Reed at the end of an untitled 1955 Palm Beach Speedway race in West Palm Beach, Florida, Pitt was awarded an additional $50 ($ when adjusted for inflation). The money came from a Mrs. Gail John Bruner using her Wachovia Bank and Trust Company bank account to access the funds.

Pitt's ultimate retirement came after finishing in last place at a 1958 race at Old Bridge Stadium that had a 27-driver grid that included Elmo Langley, Lee Petty, and Junior Johnson.

References

External links
 

1925 births
1992 deaths
Deaths from cancer in Florida
NASCAR drivers
Sportspeople from Rocky Mount, North Carolina
Racing drivers from North Carolina